Insein Township is located in northern Yangon. The township comprises 21 wards, and shares borders with Shwepyitha township in the north, Hlaingthaya township in the west, Mingaladon township in the east and Mayangon township in the south. Insein is home to the Insein Prison, the most notorious prison in the country that houses hundreds of political prisoners. With the expansion of Yangon's city limits in the 1990s which also included founding new satellite towns, Insein was formally incorporated into Yangon.

Etymology
The word "Insein" means "precious lake" in the Burmese language, and is also a former name of Inya lake. However, the etymology of "Insein" is derived from the Mon language term , meaning "elephant lake."

History

Insein was a famous battle site in the Burmese civil war that erupted after the country's independence from the United Kingdom in January 1948. Insein was the limit Karen insurgents reached in January 1949 in their ambitious attempt to take Yangon and oust the Burmese government.

Education
Insein has 33 primary schools, ten middle schools and six high schools. Karen Baptist Theological Seminary, the Myanmar Institute of Theology, the University of Paramedical Science, Yangon, Yangon Technological University and are located in the township.

Health
The Insein General Hospital is the principal hospital.
Thiri Sandar Hosital
Kwekabaw Hospital
Kaung Hospital and
KBC Hospital are private hospitals

Sport
There is  YCDC Golf Club Swimming Pool & Restaurant located at Thiri Mingalar street.

Landmarks
The following is a list of landmarks protected by the city in Insein township.

References

Townships of Yangon